Un homme sans racines is a 2004 album recorded by French singer Gérald De Palmas. It was his fourth studio album and his fifth album overall, and his most successful in terms of peak positions. It reached number one in France in its first week of release, on 24 November 2004, and remained for 14 non-consecutive weeks in the top ten and 97 weeks in the top 200. In Belgium (Wallonia), it peaked at No. 6 in its third week on 20 November 2004 and stayed for 53 weeks in the top 40. It achieved moderate success in Switzerland where it reached number 36 and was ranked for 18 weeks. This album was more intimate than the previous ones, with less music, but still in the same melancholic style. It provided a sole single : "Elle danse seule", which was No. 22 in France.

The album title refers to the singer's childhood spent in La Réunion. The song "Elle habite ici" was much aired on French radio.

According to Le Parisien, 650,000 units of the album were sold.

Track listing
 "Plus d'importance" De Palmas / De Palmas – 4:05
 "Elle danse seule" De Palmas / De Palmas – 4:10
 "Au paradis" De Palmas / De Palmas – 3:50
 "Un homme sans racines" De Palmas / De Palmas – 3:08
 "Elle habite ici" De Palmas / De Palmas – 3:07
 "Dans la cour" De Palmas / De Palmas – 3:55
 "Encore une fois" De Palmas / De Palmas – 3:32
 "Dans mon rêve" De Palmas / De Palmas – 3:24
 "Faire semblant" De Palmas / De Palmas – 4:01
 "Je ne tiendrais pas" De Palmas / De Palmas – 3:20

Source : Allmusic.

Credits and personnel
 Banjo, dobro, guitar, programming, vocals : Gerald De Palmas
 Drums : Amaury Blanchard
 Electric guitar : Sébastien Chouard
 Keyboards : Pete Gordeno
 Assistant : Denis Caribaux
 Mastering : Jean-Pierre Chalbos 
 Engineer and mixing : Steve Prestage
 Executive producer and artistic director : Chiquito
 Booklet : Claude Gassian and Sylvie Lancrenon
 Cover photo : Sylvie Lancrenon

Release history

Certifications and sales

Charts

Weekly charts

Year-end charts

References

2004 albums
Gérald de Palmas albums